Gazillionaire is a video game developed by American studio LavaMind and published by Spectrum HoloByte for the PC.

Gameplay
Gazillionaire is a trading game involving trading exotics on different planets.

Reception
Next Generation reviewed the game, rating it two stars out of five, and stated that "A great title for gaming purists or children."

Gazillionaire won Computer Game Reviews 1995 "Strategy Game of the Year" award, tied with Heroes of Might and Magic: A Strategic Quest and Blood Bowl. The editors wrote, "Tucked behind the strange graphics, bizarre names and, um, interesting items to trade was an economic engine that proved to be as good as they come."

Reviews
PC Gamer (April 1995)
Computer Gaming World (Apr, 1995)
PC Player - Jun, 1995
PC Games - Jul, 1995

References

1994 video games
Business simulation games
Spectrum HoloByte games
Video games developed in the United States
Windows games
Windows-only games